Solomon Brynn (born 30 October 2000) is an English professional footballer who plays for Swindon Town, on loan from Middlesbrough, as a goalkeeper.

Career
Born in Middlesbrough, Brynn began his career with Middlesbrough, moving on loan to Darlington in February 2021. He started the 2021–22 season on loan at Scottish club Queen of the South, before being recalled in December 2021. He moved on loan to Swindon Town in June 2022.

References

2000 births
Living people
English footballers
Middlesbrough F.C. players
Darlington F.C. players
Queen of the South F.C. players
Swindon Town F.C. players
Scottish Professional Football League players
English Football League players
Association football goalkeepers